Mohammad Hashem Mohaimeni (or Mohaymeni) (born 1955 in Gorgan, Iran) was appointed the third governor general of Golestan Province, Iran in May 2002.

References

Iranian governors
1955 births
Living people
People from Gorgan
Islamic Iran Participation Front politicians
Governors of Golestan Province